The 2017 Sun Belt women's basketball tournament is the postseason women's basketball tournament for the Sun Belt Conference beginning on March 7 and ending on March 12, 2017, at the Lakefront Arena in New Orleans.

Seeds

Schedule

Bracket

All times listed are Central

See also
2017 Sun Belt Conference men's basketball tournament

References

External links
 2017 Sun Belt Women's Basketball Championship

Sun Belt Conference women's basketball tournament
2016–17 Sun Belt Conference women's basketball season
Sun Belt Conference Women's B